Into the Lime is the first full-length album by indie pop band The New Mendicants. It was released in 2014.

Track listing
All tracks written by Joe Pernice, Norman Blake and Mike Belitsky except *Sandy Denny.

Sarasota
A Very Sorry Christmas
Cruel Annette
Follow You Down
Shouting Match
If You Only Knew Her
High on the Skyline
By the Time It Gets Dark*
Out of the Lime
Lifelike Hair

References

2014 albums